Molden is a surname. Notable people with the surname include:

Alex Molden (born 1973), American football player
Antwaun Molden (born 1985), American football player
Elijah Molden (born 1999), American football player
Ernst Molden (1886-1953), Austrian journalist and historian
Etu Molden (born 1979), American football player
Frank Molden (born 1942), American football player
Otto Molden (1918-2002), Austrian publicist